Common names: (none).
Anomalepis is a genus of nonvenomous blind snakes found in Central and South America. Currently, 4 monotypic species are recognized.

Geographic range
Found from southern Central America in Nicaragua, Costa Rica and Panama, to northwestern South America in Colombia, Ecuador and Peru.

Species

T) Type species.

References

External links
 

Anomalepididae
Snake genera
Taxa named by Giorgio Jan